Pitarenus is a genus of saltwater clams, marine bivalve molluscs in the subfamily Callocardiinae of the family Veneridae, the Venus clams.

Species
 Pitarenus cordatus (Schwengel, 1951)
 Pitarenus zonatus (Dall, 1902)

References

 Rehder H.A. & Abbott R.T. (1951). Some new and interesting mollusks from the deeper waters of the Gulf of Mexico. Revista de la Sociedad Malacologica "Carlos de la Torre". 8(2): 53–66, pls 8–9.

External links

 
Bivalve genera